Agnes of Merania (1175 – July 1201) was Queen of France by marriage to King Philip II. She is called Marie by some of the French chroniclers.

Biography
Agnes Maria was the daughter of Berthold, Duke of Merania and Agnes of Rochlitz.

In June 1196, Agnes married Philip II of France, who had repudiated his second wife Ingeborg of Denmark in 1193. Pope Innocent III espoused the cause of Ingeborg; but Philip did not submit until 1200, when, nine months after interdict had been added to excommunication, he consented to a separation from Agnes.

Agnes died giving birth to their third child in July of the next year, at the castle of Poissy, and was buried in the Convent of St Corentin, near Nantes.

Family
Agnes and Philip had two children: 
Mary, b. 1198
Philip I, Count of Boulogne, b 1200
 
Both were legitimized by the Pope in 1201.

References

Sources

External links

 
 

1175 births

1201 deaths
French queens consort
Repudiated queens
House of Andechs
House of Capet
12th-century French people
12th-century French women
13th-century French people
13th-century French women
Wives of Philip II of France
Deaths in childbirth